Ptomaphaginus is a genus of beetles belonging to the family Leiodidae. It contains about 97 species worldwide.  Most members live in caves or soil, thus eyes are absent or rudimentary. In 2008, a new species was discovered in the Sunda region. In 2017, two species in Japan were recorded, and 12 new species were discovered in China in 2015.

Species
 Ptomaphaginus agostii
 Ptomaphaginus anas
 Ptomaphaginus angusticornis
 Ptomaphaginus apiculatus
 Ptomaphaginus assimilis
 Ptomaphaginus baliensis
 Ptomaphaginus bengalicola
 Ptomaphaginus bryanti
 Ptomaphaginus bryantioides
 Ptomaphaginus bucculentus
 Ptomaphaginus burckhardti
 Ptomaphaginus caroli
 Ptomaphaginus chapmani
 Ptomaphaginus cherrapunjeensis
 Ptomaphaginus cilipes
 Ptomaphaginus clibanarius
 Ptomaphaginus coronatus
 Ptomaphaginus dao
 Ptomaphaginus depequkri
 Ptomaphaginus flavicornis
 Ptomaphaginus fornicatus
 Ptomaphaginus franki
 Ptomaphaginus geigenmuellerae
 Ptomaphaginus giachinoi
 Ptomaphaginus gibberosus
 Ptomaphaginus giganteus
 Ptomaphaginus gracilis
 Ptomaphaginus guangxiensis
 Ptomaphaginus gutianshanicus
 Ptomaphaginus hamatus
 Ptomaphaginus heterotrichus
 Ptomaphaginus honestus
 Ptomaphaginus ishizuchiensis
 Ptomaphaginus jacobsoni
 Ptomaphaginus kinabaluensis
 Ptomaphaginus kosiensis
 Ptomaphaginus kurbatovi
 Ptomaphaginus lacertosus
 Ptomaphaginus laticornis
 Ptomaphaginus latimanus
 Ptomaphaginus latipes
 Ptomaphaginus leucodon
 Ptomaphaginus loeblianus
 Ptomaphaginus longitarsis
 Ptomaphaginus luoi
 Ptomaphaginus major
 Ptomaphaginus megalayanus
 Ptomaphaginus minimus
 Ptomaphaginus mirabilis
 Ptomaphaginus miyataorum
 Ptomaphaginus murphyi
 Ptomaphaginus newtoni
 Ptomaphaginus nipponensis
 Ptomaphaginus nitens
 Ptomaphaginus obtusus
 Ptomaphaginus okinawaensis
 Ptomaphaginus oribates
 Ptomaphaginus pallidicornis
 Ptomaphaginus palpalis
 Ptomaphaginus palpaloides
 Ptomaphaginus pecki
 Ptomaphaginus perreaui
 Ptomaphaginus pilipennis
 Ptomaphaginus pilipennoides
 Ptomaphaginus pingtungensis
 Ptomaphaginus piraster
 Ptomaphaginus portevini
 Ptomaphaginus quadricalcarus
 Ptomaphaginus riedeli
 Ptomaphaginus rubidus
 Ptomaphaginus rufus
 Ptomaphaginus rugosus
 Ptomaphaginus ruzickai
 Ptomaphaginus sabahensis
 Ptomaphaginus sauteri
 Ptomaphaginus scaber
 Ptomaphaginus scaphaner
 Ptomaphaginus schawalleri
 Ptomaphaginus shennongensis
 Ptomaphaginus shibatai
 Ptomaphaginus similipes
 Ptomaphaginus similis
 Ptomaphaginus sinuatus
 Ptomaphaginus smetanai
 Ptomaphaginus takaosanus
 Ptomaphaginus takashii
 Ptomaphaginus tarsalis
 Ptomaphaginus thieleni
 Ptomaphaginus tomellerii
 Ptomaphaginus trautneri
 Ptomaphaginus troglodytes
 Ptomaphaginus truncatus
 Ptomaphaginus turensis
 Ptomaphaginus wenboi
 Ptomaphaginus wuzhishanicus
 Ptomaphaginus yaeyamaensis
 Ptomaphaginus yui

References

Beetles of Asia
Beetles of Africa
Beetles of South America
Beetles of Europe
Leiodidae